Sharp Shot is a video game released by Mattel for its Intellivision video game system in 1982. Specifically marketed towards younger children, Sharp Shot is a collection of four simple games where the object is to score points by correctly timing shots at various targets.

Gameplay
Sharp Shot consists of four separate games: Football Passing, Space Gunner, Submarine and Maze Shoot. In each game, players must push the controller's action button at the right time in order to successfully connect with the target. In the case of Football Passing, for example, points are scored for a successful forward pass, with no points scored if the receiver doesn't catch the ball. Players do not control the movement of their on-screen character, and must simply press the action button when a target passes in range.

Each game is timed, with players attempting to score as many points as possible within the given time limit. The "Space Gunner" and "Maze" games are the only games out of the four that allows two players to play simultaneously; the other two games require players to switch off after each players turn, with separate score totals maintained for either player. Player 1s score appeared in the top left, and Player 2s would appear in the top right in all four games.

Development

The games that would become Sharp Shot were originally used for an early version of interactive television known as TV POWWW, in which home players called into local television stations to play for prizes. Players controlled the game by saying "Pow!" when they wanted to shoot the targets. Later versions of the TV POWWW software were written by the staff at APh Technological Consulting, the company hired by Mattel Electronics to develop the hardware and software for Intellivision.

As Mattel was contracted to purchase a certain number of games from APh, the company decided to package the four games together as a simple game for younger children to play. While Mattel's marketing department agreed to promote the game, one of Mattel's vice presidents complained that the game was too simplistic and that consumers would complain that the game was graphically no different than earlier games for the rival Atari 2600. Ultimately, the game was released with a label reiterating that the intended audience was young children.

Legacy
Sharp Shot was re-released as part of the Intellivision Lives! collection for personal computers and game consoles. The game was also released on Microsoft's Game Room service.

References

External links
 Sharp Shot at GameFAQs

1982 video games
Intellivision games
Intellivision-only games
Mattel video games
North America-exclusive video games
Multiplayer and single-player video games
Video games developed in the United States